Christopher W. Johnson, FRSE, FRAeS, FBCS, is a British computer scientist and Pro Vice Chancellor for Engineering and Physical Sciences at Queen's University, Belfast.  Previously he was Professor and Head of Computing Science at the University of Glasgow, UK.

Education and early life
Chris Johnson was born on 15 April 1965. He was educated at Verulam School, Trinity College, Cambridge (MA), and the University of York (MSc, DPhil).

Career and research
Johnson's research focuses on the resilience of safety-critical systems.

He supported the United Nations in improving the cyber security of Chemical, Biological, Radiological and Nuclear facilities (CBRN).  
Johnson designed the cyber incident reporting processes under Article 13a of the Framework Directive (2009/140/EC) and Article 4 of the e-Privacy directive (2002/58/EC) on behalf of the European Network and Information Security Agency (ENISA). 
Prior to that he helped develop European guidelines for contingency planning in aviation for EUROCONTROL and accident investigation for the European Railway Agency.

Johnson has held fellowships from NASA (Langley Research Center and Johnson Space Center) and the US Air Force. He has also supported safety and cybersecurity in the US Navy and the US Federal Aviation Administration.

Other Appointments
He was an expert witness for the Grenfell Tower Inquiry (2020–21) where he addressed the communications issues that exacerbated the evacuation of the residents.

Johnson was elected to the UK Computing Research Committee (2016-); where he is responsible for the interface with public policy.

He chairs the EPSRC Strategic Advisory Team on ICT (2021-).

He is a member of the Stormont All Party Group on STEM.

He was a member of the Scottish Government's Public Sector Cyber Resilience group and helped lead the Scottish Universities Computing Science Alliance (SICSA) in cybersecurity.

Previously, Johnson chaired the scientific advisory board to the EC SESAR programme for the modernisation of Air Traffic Management.
In 2017, he helped deliver the UK Department for Transport review of Cyber Security across the UK aviation industry and was the only academic invited to present at the UN/ICAO first summit of cyber security in aviation.

Awards and honours 
He is a Fellow of the Royal Society of Edinburgh, a Fellow of the Royal Aeronautical Society and of the British Computer Society.

References 

1965 births
Academics of the University of Glasgow
Computer systems researchers
Living people